Mercury Retrograde is a live album by Jesse Malin,  recorded at the Mercury Lounge, New York City in December 2007. The album was originally only released online, on June 3, 2008, and was released on CD on November 10, 2008. On the CD released by One Little Indian Records, the first thirteen tracks are from the live set; the final five tracks are studio recordings.  The version of the CD released by Adeline Records contains fifteen live songs plus one studio recording unique to this version.

Track listing (One Little Indian Records)

 "High Lonesome" 4:08
 "Wendy" 4:21
 "Hotel Columbia" 3:26
 "Lucinda" 2:46
 "Subway" 4:11
 "Cigarettes & Violets" 4:14
 "Since You're in Love" 4:21
 "Helpless" 3:34
 "Aftermath" 6:10
 "Broken Radio" 6:40
 "Going Out West" 3:48
 "Swingin' Man" 5:30
 "Xmas" 3:29
 "Leaving Babylon" 4:08
 "Megan Don't Know" 2:46
 "It's Not Enough" 1:16
 "Lady from Baltimore" 2:53
 "Fairytale of New York" 4:47

Track listing (Adeline Records)

 High Lonesome; 4:08
 Wendy; 4:21
 Hotel Columbia; 3:26
 Lucinda; 2:46
 Subway; 4:11
 Cigarettes & Violets; 4:14
 Little Star
 Since You're in Love; 4:21
 Helpless; 3:34
 Aftermath; 6:10
 Black Haired Girl
 Broken Radio; 6:40
 Going Out West; 3:48
 Swingin' Man; 5:30
 Xmas; 3:29
 Christmas (Baby Please Come Home)[Studio Recording]

References

External links
Official site of Jesse Malin
Adeline Records

Jesse Malin albums
2008 live albums
One Little Independent Records live albums